Temma is a rural locality in the local government area (LGA) of Circular Head in the North-west and west LGA region of Tasmania. The 2016 census recorded a population of 10 for the state suburb of Temma.

History 
Temma was gazetted as a locality in 1963. The name was changed from Strickland in 1909. It is believed to be an Aboriginal word for “hut”. 

The area was originally a mining settlement.

Geography
The waters of the Southern Ocean form the western boundary.

Road infrastructure 
Route C214 (Rebecca Road) runs along the northern boundary. Temma Road provides access to the locality.

References

Towns in Tasmania
Localities of Circular Head Council